Digitaria compacta is a grass species native to India and Indochina. It is cultivated in the Khasi Hills of northeast India, used as a glutinous flour for making bread or porridge, and known as raishan.

See also
Digitaria exilis, white fonio, used as a grain crop in West Africa
Digitaria iburua, black fonio, used as a grain crop in West Africa
Digitaria sanguinalis, considered a weed around the world, but traditionally used as a grain crop in Europe

References

compacta
Flora of Assam (region)
Flora of East Himalaya
Flora of Indo-China
Cereals